Benedict John Osta (15 August 1931 – 30 January 2014) was an Indian Roman Catholic archbishop.

Osta was ordained to the priesthood in 1963 for the Society of Jesus, In 1980 he was named bishop of the Diocese of Patna, India, and then was named archbishop of Patna in 1999. Osta retired in 2007. He died on 30 January 2014 at the age of 82.

Notes

1931 births
2014 deaths
20th-century Indian Jesuits
21st-century Roman Catholic archbishops in India
Jesuit archbishops